Adolphe Dumont (born 1899, date of death unknown) was a Luxembourgian wrestler. He competed at the 1924 and the 1928 Summer Olympics.

References

External links
 

1899 births
Year of death missing
Olympic wrestlers of Luxembourg
Wrestlers at the 1924 Summer Olympics
Wrestlers at the 1928 Summer Olympics
Luxembourgian male sport wrestlers
Place of birth missing